Eytan Elbaz is an American entrepreneur and investor best known for co-founding, along with his brother Gil Elbaz and Adam Weissman, Applied Semantics (ASI), which would later become Google AdSense. He is an angel investor and founder of many Los Angeles companies, most notably Scopely, a mobile gaming startup. He is also the founder and Chairman of the Board of Render Media, a new-age digital media start up.

Education
Beginning in 1991, Eytan attended the University of California, Los Angeles, where he graduated with a Bachelor of Science in Computer Science and Engineering in 1995.

Career
After graduation, Elbaz worked in software sales for four years. In 1999, Elbaz co-founded Oingo, Inc in Santa Monica. Oingo launched at the Fall 1999 Internet World, and won the "Best of Show" Award in the category of Outstanding Internet Service. Oingo launched AdSense in December 2000. Oingo changed its name to Applied Semantics in 2001.

In April 2003, Applied Semantics was acquired by Google for US$102 million in a deal that included pre-IPO Google company stock. As part of the acquisition deal, Elbaz, and over 40 members of the Applied Semantics team joined Google and became Google Santa Monica. Elbaz served as Head of Domain Channel at Google from 2003 to 2007.

References

American investors
University of California, Los Angeles alumni
Living people
Year of birth missing (living people)